Gheorghe Rășcanu Stadium is a multi-purpose stadium in Timișoara, Romania. It is currently used mostly for rugby matches by the local team, Timișoara Saracens. The stadium is named after Timișoara Saracens' legend Gheorghe Rășcanu who played for Timișoara during its golden era.

History 
The stadium was built in 2011 after the board members of Timișoara Saracens decided to set an objective of winning the title of the Romanian First Division after 40 years, which they did in the 2012–2013 season. The 300,000-euro stadium also includes minifootball pitches along with tennis and basketball pitches for the Timișoara Sports Club which owns Timișoara Saracens. The stadium underwent some repair work in 2018 and 2021, and in the following years it will be completely rebuilt.

References 

Buildings and structures in Timișoara
Multi-purpose stadiums in Romania